Salvia confertiflora, the Sabra spike sage, is a species of flowering plant in the family Lamiaceae, native to Brazil. This herbaceous perennial reaches  in height, and  spread in one season, becoming shrubby at the base with age.

The leaves bear a sage scent. The inflorescences are covered with velvety red-brown hairs, with the stems and the calyx also having a red-brown color. The  flowers are orange-red, and very profuse, explaining the epithet confertiflora, or "crowded with flowers". The plant grows so large that it needs staking and protection from wind in gardens.

The plant is cultivated as an ornamental in temperate and tropical horticulture. As it does not tolerate freezing temperatures, it requires protection in cold temperate zones, and a sheltered position in full sun.

Notes

confertiflora
Flora of Brazil